Bicycle Lake is a dry lake in the Mojave Desert of San Bernardino County, California,  northeast of Barstow.

Bicycle Lake is on federal lands and contains the Bicycle Lake Army Airfield.

See also
 List of lakes in California

References

Endorheic lakes of California
Lakes of the Mojave Desert
Lakes of San Bernardino County, California
Lakes of California
Lakes of Southern California